"Perfect World" is a song recorded by South Korean girl group Twice. It was released by Warner Music Japan on June 29, 2021, as a digital single from their third Japanese studio album of the same name (2021).

Background and release 
In June 2021, two teasers for "Perfect World" were posted before its release. The song was officially released on June 29, 2021.

Composition 
"Perfect World" was composed by Woo Min Lee "collapsedone", Justin Reinstein, JJean and LACND, with lyrics written by Risa Horie. Running for 3 minutes and 3 seconds, the song is composed in the key of D-sharp minor with a tempo of 135 beats per minute.

Music video 
On June 29, 2021, the song's music video was released on YouTube. It was directed by Yoojeong Ko. Carmen Chin of NME described the video of the group performing the song with a "captivating" choreography routine, which later causes the stage to "crash and burn" around them.

Commercial performance 
In the week of July 7, 2021, "Perfect World" debuted and peaked at number twenty-four on the Billboard Japan Hot 100. It later received a Silver certification from the Recording Industry Association of Japan (RIAJ).

Personnel 
Credits adapted from Melon.

 Twice – lead vocals
 Risa Horie – lyricist
 Woo Min Lee "collapsedone" – arrangement, composition
 Justin Reinstein – composition
 Jjean – composition
 LACND – arrangement, composition

Charts

Certifications

Release history

References 

2021 singles
2021 songs
Japanese-language songs
Twice (group) songs